Arthur Jay Gillette (October 28, 1869 – March 21, 1921) was an American orthopedic and pediatric surgeon, after whom the Gillette State Hospital for Crippled Children (now the Gillette Children's Specialty Healthcare) in St. Paul, Minnesota was named.

Arthur J. Gillette grew up on a farm in what is now South St. Paul, son of Albert and Ellen Gillette and  attended Hamline University in the early 1880s. In 1883, Arthur Gillette decided to become a doctor and studied at the Minnesota Hospital College and the St. Paul Medical College in downtown St. Paul. After his graduation he moved to New York and  studied orthopaedic surgery under the renowned Dr. Lewis Albert Sayer and Dr. Newton Shaffer. 

Dr. Gillette returned to Minnesota in 1888 where orthopaedic surgery became his specialty. By 1890, Dr. Gillette was Minnesota's first full-time orthopaedist and was an instructor at the University of Minnesota Medical School in what he called "this almost new science" of orthopaedic surgery.
	
On April 23, 1897, the legislature gave the University of Minnesota the authority to establish a "Minnesota Institute for Crippled and Indigent Children." A ward was set aside at City and County Hospital in St. Paul the state providing braces and surgical appliances at minimal cost.  The regents named Dr. Gillette chief surgeon and Dr. Gillette's medical school colleagues agreed to donate their services.
  	  	  	
Dr. Gillette married Katherine Kennedy, a school teacher at the hospital, in 1905. The couple began an annual tradition of inviting young patients to have a picnic on the grounds of their St. Paul mansion.
  	  	  	  	
The number of patients Dr. Gillette served outgrew the space at City and County Hospital and the need for a separate institution was apparent. Citizens of St. Paul, the Business League and the Commercial Club of St. Paul donated  in Phalen Park and its new facilities opened in 1911.  

On March 21, 1921, Dr. Gillette died at the age of 57. He had been responsible for the treatment of 4,171 children. More than 80 percent were cured or discharged as improved and able to live independently. In 1925, in memory of Dr. Gillette, the hospital was renamed the Gillette State Hospital for Crippled Children (now Gillette Children's Specialty Healthcare).

References
Koop, Steven E., We hold this treasure: the story of Gillette Children's Hospital, Afton, Minnesota: Afton Historical Society Press, c 1998.

External links
Gillette Children's Specialty Healthcare

American orthopedic surgeons
1863 births
1921 deaths
Hamline University alumni
American pediatric surgeons
Physicians from Minnesota
19th-century American physicians
19th-century surgeons
20th-century American physicians
20th-century surgeons
University of Minnesota faculty